Hailey is a surname, and may refer to:
 Arthur Hailey, British/Canadian novelist
 Ashawna Hailey (1949–2011), a creator of the HSPICE program
 Cedric Hailey known as K-Ci, R&B singer
 Charles Hailey, American astrophysicist
 Elizabeth Forsythe Hailey, American journalist and playwright
 Evelyn Momsen Hailey (1921–2011), Virginia State Senator
 Henry Hailey (1851–1932), English cricketer
 Homer Hailey, American preacher
 Joel Hailey, R&B singer, member of K-Ci & JoJo
 John Hailey, Congressional delegate from the Idaho Territory of the United States
 Joshua Hailey, an American privateer during the War of 1812
 Ken Hailey (born 1961), Canadian Football player
 Kendall Hailey, published autodidact
 Leisha Hailey, American actress
 Louis Hailey (1926–2019), Australian field hockey player
 Malcolm Hailey, 1st Baron Hailey (1872–1969), British peer and administrator in British India
 Oliver Hailey (1932-1993), American playwright
 O. E. Hailey, American politician from Idaho
 Robert Hailey (born 1951), English cricketer
 Thomas G. Hailey, American jurist

Fictional
 Anita Hailey, character in the anime and manga Case Closed

See also
 Hailey (disambiguation)
 Haile (surname)
 Haley (surname)
 Halley (surname)

Surnames